Heartaches and Tears is the fourth studio album released by American country artist, Jean Shepard. The album was released in January 1962 on Capitol Records and was produced by Marvin Hughes. It produced one single, which was released a year prior to the album's release.

Background and content 
Heartaches and Tears was recorded a year before its official release in two separate recording sessions. The first took place on May 8, 1961, and the second took place the following day. This was the second of Shepard's albums to not be recorded in California, instead being recorded in Nashville, Tennessee at the Bradley Film and Recording Studio. Heartaches and Tears was produced by Nashville A&R man, Marvin Hughes. Although it was not the first session of Shepard's that Hughes produced, it was the first album to be completed by him. All previous releases had been recorded under the direction of West Coast producer Ken Nelson. Session musicians used for the production of Heartaches and Tears consisted of The A-Team. This group of background musicians played on recordings for most Nashville-based artists during the late 1950s and 1960s. They would appear in many of Shepard's albums during the sixties decade. Unlike Shepard's previous release (Got You on My Mind), the songs on the record were mainly new material. Examples of this included songs such as, "I Don't Remember", "Would Be Satisfied", and "I'd Like to Know Where People Go". However, a cover version of "Jealous Heart" appears at the end of the album. The tracks on the release were written by some of Nashville's well-known songwriters, including Jack Rhodes and Marijohn Wilkin.

Release 
Heartaches and Tears was officially released in January 1962. It was released under Capitol Records on a Vinyl LP. Because Billboard'''s Top Country Albums chart was not yet created, the album did not chart on that list. Additionally, it did not appear among any Billboard or Cashbox record chart. Allmusic reviewed Heartaches and Tears'', giving the album four out of five stars. However, an official album review was not provided.

Track listing 
Side one
"How Long Does It Hurt (When a Heart Breaks)" – (Virginia Midgett, D.W. Orinich)
"Leave Me Alone" – (Wayne P. Walker)
"Go on with You Dancing" – (Jack Rhodes)
"I Don't Remember" – (Marijohn Wilkin)
"Are You Certain" – (Bennie Benjamin, Sol Marcus)
"Would You Be Satisfied" – (Johnny Mullins)

Side two
"So Wrong So Fast" – (Frankie Walcher)
"Second Best" – (Marie Wilson)
"I Lost You After All" – (Helen Carter, Ira Louvin)
"I'd Like to Know (Where People Go)" – (Roy Drusky, Vic McAlpin)
"If You Were Losing Him to Me" – (H. Carter, June Carter)
"Jealous Heart" – (Jenny Lou Carson)

Personnel 
 Floyd Cramer – piano
 Ray Edenton – rhythm guitar
 Buddy Harman – drums
 Roy Huskey Jr. – bass
 The Jordanaires – background vocals
 Grady Martin – guitar
 Hal Rugg – steel guitar
 Jean Shepard – lead vocals

References 

1962 albums
Jean Shepard albums
Capitol Records albums
Albums produced by Ken Nelson (United States record producer)